Finep ( or Funding Authority for Studies and Projects) is an organization of the Brazilian federal government under the Ministry of Science of Technology, devoted to funding of science and technology in the country.

External links
 FINEP website

Scientific organisations based in Brazil